The following is a list of football stadiums in Bosnia and Herzegovina, ordered by capacity.

References

See also

List of European stadiums by capacity
List of association football stadiums by capacity

 
Bosnia and Herzegovina
stadiums
Football stadiums